Katrina is a 1969 South African drama film directed by Jans Rautenbach and starring Katinka Heyns, Jill Kirkland and Don Leonard. Based on a play called Try for White by D Warner, the film depicts the lives of a family of a Coloured South Africans, who in the apartheid system are considered neither white nor black, in which Katrina, the daughter, attempts to appear white, before her secret is exposed. The screenplay was written by Emil Nofal.

Cast
 Katinka Heyns - Alida Brink
 Jill Kirkland - Catherine Winters / Katrina September
 Don Leonard - Kimberley
 Cobus Rossouw - Adam September
 Joe Stewardson - Father Alex Trewellyn
 Carel Trichardt - Mr. Brink

References

Bibliography
 Tomaselli, Keyan. The cinema of apartheid: race and class in South African film. Routledge, 1989.

External links

1969 films
1969 drama films
Afrikaans-language films
Apartheid films
Films about racism
Films about race and ethnicity
Films shot in South Africa
Films directed by Jans Rautenbach
South African drama films